Metzneria aprilella, the brilliant neb, is a moth of the family Gelechiidae. It is widely distributed throughout Europe. Outside of Europe, it is found in Turkey, Kazakhstan, Uzbekistan, Iran and southern Siberia. The habitat consists of waste ground and grassland.

The wingspan is 13–18 mm. Adults are on wing from May to August.

The larvae feed on Centaurea scabiosa and Centaurea solstitialis. They feed on the seeds from within the seedhead. The species overwinters in the larval stage within a silken chamber.

References

Moths described in 1854
Metzneria
Moths of Europe
Insects of Turkey